Daniel Majstorović (born on 5 April 1977) is a Swedish former footballer who played as a centre back.

He started his career with IF Brommapojkarna in his native Sweden. After a year with the club, he moved to German side SC Fortuna Köln in 1997, subsequently moving back to Sweden just a year later when he signed for Västerås SK. His form then earned him a move to Malmö FF, where he won his first trophy, the 2004 Allsvenskan, and his first international call-up for the Swedish national team in 2003.

In 2004, he moved to Dutch Eredivisie club FC Twente for a fee of €800,000, and after one season he signed for Swiss Super League side FC Basel for €1.3 million. He won the double of league and cup in the 2007–08 season. He scored 11 goals in the double-winning season, and finished as the club's second top goalscorer. In 2008, then he moved to Greek Superleague side AEK Athens on a free transfer. He was released in 2010 due to financial problems at the club and was then signed by Scottish Premier League team Celtic. In Scotland, he won the 2010–11 Scottish Cup and 2011–12 Scottish Premier League.

Club career

Early career

Before starting his football career, Majstorović played at the youth level at Övergrans IF and FF Habo. He began his professional career with IF Brommapojkarna in 1995, playing 20 games in his debut season. The next year, he only played 14 games and scored once but was still spotted German side Fortuna Köln, who secured his signature in 1997. On 15 February 1998, Majstorović made his debut for the club in a 2–2 draw against KFC Uerdingen 05. Since making his debut, Majstorović was a first-team regular, scoring his first goal for the club on 14 March 1998 in a 1–1 draw against FC St. Pauli, his only goal in German professional football.

Västerås SK

Majstorović did not play many more games in Germany, where in his second year he made just seven, scoring one goal. He then returned to Sweden the following year, signing with Västerås SK. The club was in the pre-season from the Allsvenskan gone and missed with a third party as a table Majstorović just the direct re-emergence. The following year was only a midfield place after all of the qualifications for the new single-track second division meant. He became a fans' favourite at Västerås and was watched by scouts from the Swedish national team, the Serbian national team—owing to his Serbian heritage—and Malmö FF.oink

Malmö FF
Majstorović's good performances for Västerås earned him a move to Swedish club Malmö FF—just promoted to Allsvenskan—where he rose to become a cult hero. There were also economic reasons behind Majstorović's transfer to the club—Västerås were in deep economic trouble and in risk of relegation. Malmö FF would lose six points in the league if this happened and thus made a bid to save the club and purchase a quality player simultaneously. At the club, the emergence of young talent Zlatan Ibrahimović led to the return to Allsvenskan in 2001.

With the club, Majstorović could lay down in front of the table with 18 games of the season and he carried in his 2004 season with the championship title for the first time in 15 years. That same year he was elected by the opponents in the league at the worst possible opponent. Majstorović spent four years at Malmö, playing 86 games and scoring nine goals. He then sought a bigger challenge and a better league to play in so he could earn more international caps.

Twente
Majstorović moved to Dutch club FC Twente in 2004 for €800,000, with whom he played 50 games, accompanied by four goals. His most notable moment with the club was when they won the UEFA Intertoto Cup 2006. Although he played well at Twente, his time there was shrouded in controversy — in March 2005, he was cleared of a seven-game Eredivisie ban for allegedly elbowing FC Groningen forward Martin Drent and in December of the same year he was involved in a training ground confrontation with team-mate Blaise Nkufo. A week later, Majstorović later came too late for training and he was released because of this lack of discipline by the club.

Basel
In January 2006, Majstorović signed  for Swiss champions FC Basel for €1.3 million despite interest from Ajax, PSV, and Newcastle United. He made an instant impact at Basel by scoring the equaliser in a 1–1 draw with AS Monaco in France in his second game for the club, which helped the team go through to the quarter-finals of the UEFA Cup. He was sent off during the second leg of that UEFA Cup quarter-final tie against Middlesbrough at the Riverside Stadium while Basel were leading on away goals rule after beating Middlesbrough 2–0 at St. Jakob-Park. Middlesbrough went on to win the match 4–1 and the tie 4–3, and many of the Basel supporters held Majstorović partly responsible.

Majstorović was also vice-captain at Basel and led the team out whenever Ivan Ergić was not playing. Majstorović had an excellent scoring record at Basel, averaging nearly one goal every seven games. He regularly lingered in the opposition's penalty area when attacking corners and due to his great heading ability, he usually converted high balls into the back of the net. He is also a spot-kick specialist and scored the winner for Basel in the 2007 Swiss Cup final by netting from the penalty spot in the 93rd minute. He showed his love for Basel and their passionate fans by kissing the badge on his shirt as his goal celebration. At the end of the 2007–08 season, he was Basel's second top goal-scorer with 10 goals, behind 12-goal Marco Streller. The explanation for his many goals is because during his time with Basel, Majstorović became the club's first choice penalty taker. In January 2008, he was set to move to Turkish club Trabzonspor but the move fell through.

AEK Athens
On 19 May 2008, Majstorović signed a three-year contract with Greek club AEK Athens, having turned down an offer from Lazio. He played his first competitive match for AEK on 14 August 2008, in a 1–0 defeat to Cypriot side AC Omonia at the Olympic Stadium in a UEFA Cup qualifying match. Majstorović's first goal for AEK was against Asteras Tripolis. He scored again against Asteras Tripolis giving the win to his team on 22 February 2009. He co-operated in the defence with the Greek international defender Sotiris Kyrgiakos, and Geraldo Alves. Majstorović scored his third goal for AEK in the Greek Cup semi-finals against Panserraikos on 18 March 2009. Majstorović scored the winning goal against Benfica in the Europa League on 1 October 2009.

Celtic
On 16 August 2010, Majstorović signed a two-year deal with Scottish Premier League club Celtic on a free transfer. Majstorović made his Celtic debut in the Europa League match against Dutch side FC Utrecht on 19 August 2010 in a 2–0 victory and his SPL debut three days later in a 4–0 win at home against St Mirren. Majstorović captained the side to a 2–1 victory over Kilmarnock when captain Scott Brown went off injured, captained the side again three days later against Inverness Caledonian Thistle in a League Cup tie which ended in a 6–0 win for Celtic. Majstorović scored his first goal for Celtic on 9 January 2011 in a 2–0 Scottish Cup win against Third Division side Berwick Rangers. He scored his first league goal for Celtic in a 3–1 win over Dundee United on 13 February 2011 at Tannadice. Majstorović played the full 90 minutes, picking up a yellow card, as Celtic won 3–0 against Motherwell in the 2011 Scottish Cup Final.

On 18 December 2011, Majstorović suffered a fractured cheekbone after a collision with St Johnstone midfielder David Robertson. After nearly eight weeks out injured, he returned to the first team on 8 February 2012, playing 27 minutes in a 4–0 win over Hearts. On 28 February 2012, Majstorović was ruled out for the remainder of the Scottish Premier League, due to rupturing his cruciate ligament after colliding with Zlatan Ibrahimović and Anders Svensson in training. The injury threw Majstorović's Celtic career into jeopardy as his contract is set to run out at the end of the 2011–12 campaign.

After a lot of speculation he decided not to extend his contract with the Glasgow club.

AIK
On 15 May 2012, it was confirmed that Majstorović was leaving Celtic to join Allsvenskan outfit AIK in August 2012, signing a -year deal at the Swedish club. He parted ways with them on mutual consent, 6 January 2014.

On 4 February 2014, Majstorovic announced his retirement as a player and stated that he intended to become an agent.

International career

Majstorović was selected for the Sweden squad after turning in good performances for Malmö in the UEFA Cup and Swedish Allsvenskan. He made his international debut in the 3–2 King's Cup win against Qatar and scored in his second match against Thailand in a 4–1 victory. Majstorović was on stand-by for Euro 2004 in Portugal and the 2006 World Cup in Germany.

He made substitute appearances against Iceland in Reykjavík and Northern Ireland in Belfast during the Euro 2008 qualifiers, as well as starting against Liechtenstein in Vaduz and Latvia in Solna. Majstorović was finally called into the squad for a major tournament, taking part at Euro 2008 in Austria and Switzerland. Sweden failed to qualify for the 2010 FIFA World Cup, but qualified as best runner-up for UEFA Euro 2012. In scoring an own goal against England in November 2011, he became the goalscorer of the 2000th goal in England's history. While preparing for a friendly match against Croatia in Zagreb on 28 February 2012, Majstorović ruptured a cruciate ligament, which prevented him from playing in Euro 2012.

Personal life
Majstorović is a father of three; he has a son, Antonio, and two daughters, Danielle and Celine. He has appeared in Swedish sport documentaries Malmö FF – Allsvenskan 2004 and Vägen tillbaka – Blådårar 2. He speaks seven different languages: Serbian, Danish, Dutch, English, Norwegian, German, Greek and his native Swedish. He is of Serb descent.

Career statistics

Club

International

Scores and results list Sweden's goal tally first, score column indicates score after each Majstorović goal.

Honours
Malmö
 Allsvenskan: 2004

Basel
 Axpo Super League: 2008
 Swiss Cup: 2008

Celtic
 Scottish Cup: 2011
 Scottish Premier League: 2011–12
Individual
 Swedish Goal of the Year: 2002

References

External links

 
 
 
 

1977 births
Living people
Swedish footballers
Sweden under-21 international footballers
Sweden international footballers
Association football central defenders
IF Brommapojkarna players
SC Fortuna Köln players
Västerås SK Fotboll players
AEK Athens F.C. players
AEK F.C. non-playing staff
Celtic F.C. players
FC Basel players
Malmö FF players
FC Twente players
AIK Fotboll players
2. Bundesliga players
Eredivisie players
Swedish people of Serbian descent
Expatriate footballers in Germany
Swedish expatriate sportspeople in Germany
Expatriate footballers in Greece
Swedish expatriate sportspeople in Greece
Expatriate footballers in the Netherlands
Swedish expatriate sportspeople in the Netherlands
Expatriate footballers in Scotland
Swedish expatriate sportspeople in the United Kingdom
Expatriate footballers in Switzerland
Swedish expatriate sportspeople in Switzerland
Swedish expatriate footballers
Allsvenskan players
UEFA Euro 2008 players
Super League Greece players
Swiss Super League players
Scottish Premier League players
Footballers from Stockholm
Serb diaspora sportspeople
Swedish expatriate sportspeople in Scotland